Hanau is a town in Germany and Lichtenberg is a village in Alsace, now France. This list of rulers of Hanau or Hanau-Lichtenberg covers the lords and later counts that ruled the area from the 14th through the 18th centuries (see also Lichtenberg Castle).

Lords of Hanau (1243–1429) 

In 1429, Reinhard II was raised to Imperial Count

Counts of Hanau (1429–1458) 

In 1458, the county was divided in two parts, later named Hanau-Münzenberg and Hanau-Lichtenberg.

Counts of Hanau-Münzenberg (1458–1736) 

In 1736, Hanau-Münzenberg fell to Hesse-Kassel

Counts of Hanau-Lichtenberg (1458–1736) 

In 1736, Hanau-Lichtenberg fell to Hesse-Darmstadt

Han
Hanau
!
!
!
!
People from Alsace
Lists of French nobility
Lists of German nobility